Jakob Kjersem (2 August 1925 – 11 June 2009) was a Norwegian long-distance runner. At the 1948 Summer Olympics he finished twelfth in the 10,000 metres final, and at the 1952 Summer Olympics he placed 24th in the marathon. He never won the 10,000 m Norwegian title, placing second in 1948, 1949, 1951 and 1956. His rivals were Martin Stokken and Øistein Saksvik.

He also won medals in the 5000 metres and the marathon. He excelled in several now-defunct events, having seven national titles in the 25 kilometres road race, the 8 kilometres cross-country race as well as the forest race, won between 1949 and 1960.

He was a journalist and farmer by occupation, and published books on local sport history. He died in June 2009.

References

1925 births
2009 deaths
Norwegian male long-distance runners
Athletes (track and field) at the 1948 Summer Olympics
Athletes (track and field) at the 1952 Summer Olympics
Olympic athletes of Norway
Norwegian male marathon runners
People from Vestnes
Sportspeople from Møre og Romsdal